Azna (also Romanized as Aznā) is a village in Silakhor Rural District, Silakhor District, Dorud County, Lorestan Province, Iran. At the 2006 census, its population was 463, in 129 families.

References 

Towns and villages in Dorud County